The 1934–35 Palestine League was the third season of league football in the British Mandate for Palestine. The season started on 22 December 1934 and was abandoned in March 1935, first due to preparations to the 1935 Maccabiah Games and then due to disagreements between Maccabi and Hapoel

Initially the EIFA set the number of teams in the league to eight, seven from the previous season (without Maccabi Rehovot that failed to register for the season) and an eighth spot to be decided after two test matches between Hakoah Tel Aviv and Hapoel Petah Tikva. After two test matches, each won 2–1 by each team, the EIFA expanded the league to ten teams, including both teams and Maccabi Rehovot.

League table

References

RSSSF.
100 Years of Football 1906–2006, Elisha Shohat (Israel), 2006.
EIFA League Tables 1930–1948, Eran Rabl (Israel), 2022.

Palestine League seasons
Palestine
1934–35 in Mandatory Palestine football
Football
Football